Mariela Campos (born 4 January 1991) is a Costa Rican international footballer who plays as a midfielder for the Costa Rica women's national football team. She appeared in one match for Costa Rica at the 2018 CONCACAF Women's Championship.

References

1991 births
Living people
Women's association football midfielders
Costa Rican women's footballers
Costa Rica women's international footballers
Pan American Games competitors for Costa Rica
Footballers at the 2011 Pan American Games